Katzbach may refer to:

Katzbach (Kraichbach), a river in Baden-Württemberg, Germany, tributary of the Kraichbach
Katzbach (Schwarzach), a river of Bavaria, Germany, tributary of the Schwarzach being itself a tributary of the Naab
Kaczawa (German: Katzbach), a river in the Lower Silesian Voivodeship in Poland
Katzbach Mountains, a mountain range in the Western Sudetes in Poland
Battle of the Katzbach, on 26 August 1813, a major battle of the Napoleonic Wars
Katzbach Railway, a branch line in southwestern Germany